IIFA Utsavam Award for Best Actress - Telugu is given by the International Indian Film Academy in South Indian segment which is known as IIFA Utsavam  as part of annual ceremony for Telugu Films, to recognise a female actor who has delivered an outstanding performance in a leading role. The recipient is chosen by watchers and the winner is announced at the ceremony.

Winners
Year indicates film release year.

Nominations
2015:Shruti Haasan - Srimanthudu
 Lakshmi Manchu - Dongaata
 Lavanya Tripathi - Bhale Bhale Magadivoy
 Nithya Menen - Malli Malli Idi Rani Roju
 Tamannaah - Baahubali: The Beginning
2016: Samantha Ruth Prabhu - A Aa
 Anushka Shetty - Rudhramadevi
 Anushka Shetty - Size Zero
 Pragya Jaiswal - Kanche
 Ritu Varma - Pelli Choopulu

References

IIFA Utsavam
Film awards for lead actress